Sergio Casal and Javier Sánchez were the defending champions, but Casal did not participate this year.   Sánchez partnered Goran Prpić, losing in the first round.

Jacco Eltingh and Mark Koevermans won in the final 5–7, 7–6, 7–5, against Menno Oosting and Olli Rahnasto.

Seeds

  Goran Prpić /  Javier Sánchez (first round)
  Jacco Eltingh /  Mark Koevermans (champions)
  Menno Oosting /  Olli Rahnasto (final)
  Per Henricsson /  Ola Jonsson (semifinals)

Draw

Draw

References
Draw

ATP Athens Open
1991 ATP Tour